Stephen Finucan is a Canadian fiction writer.

Life
Finucan graduated from Trent University with a BA in literature and the University of East Anglia with an MA in creative writing. He is an instructor at the University of Toronto School of Continuing Studies, as well as a frequent contributor to The Toronto Star book pages.

Literary career
Finucan's short stories and essays have appeared in numerous magazines, including Saturday Night, THIS Magazine, The Sewanee Review, The New Quarterly and B&A. He won the Humber School for Writers Prize in 1997, and was named Write Magazine's New Writer of the Year in 2000. His work has been shortlisted for the Upper Canada Brewing Company's Writer's Craft Award and the Ian St. James Award for Short Fiction. His debut novel, "The Fallen", was chosen as one of CBC Canada Reads Top 40 Essential Canadian Novels of the Decade.

Works
Happy Pilgrims (Insomniac Press, 2000)
Foreigners (Penguin Group, 2003)
The Fallen (Penguin Group, 2009)

References

External links
  "Foreigners"
  "The Fallen"

Canadian male short story writers
Trent University alumni
Alumni of the University of East Anglia
Living people
21st-century Canadian short story writers
21st-century Canadian male writers
Year of birth missing (living people)